The Greeks of Toronto (Greek: Έλληνες του Τορόντο) comprises Greek immigrants and their descendants living in Toronto, Canada.

According to the Canada 2016 Census, the Greater Toronto Area (GTA) is home to 97,940 Greek Canadians (1.69% of its total population), making it the metropolitan area with the highest concentration of Greeks in the country. Toronto is an important Greek population centre in North America, along with Boston, Chicago and New York City.

Demographics 

The GTA cities and towns by population of Greek Canadians are as follows, according to 2016 Census:

The GTA ridings (Federal electoral districts) with the highest percentage of Greek Canadians are as follows, according to 2016 Census:

Greek is the 20th most commonly spoken language in the Toronto CMA, with 41,225 people (0.7% of the population) speaking Greek (2016 Census).

In the City of Toronto per se, Greek is the 17th most common ethnic origin, being claimed by 57,425 people (2.1% of the population), as per 2016 Census.

Furthermore, as designated by the City of Toronto 2006 Census data (total responses), Greek is the top ethnic origin in the Broadview North neighborhood (15% of the population).

History 

The 1918 Toronto anti-Greek riot was a pogrom affecting the Greek community.

Culture 

Greek culture in Toronto can be seen in Greektown, the largest Greek neighbourhood in North America.

See also 

 Demographics of Toronto
 Greektown, Toronto

References 

European-Canadian culture in Ontario
European-Canadian culture in Toronto
Toronto